96000 may refer to:
 "96,000", a song from the 2007 musical In the Heights by Lin-Manuel Miranda
 Motorola 96000, family of digital signal processor (DSP) chips produced by Motorola
 The number 96,000 (see 90,000)
 96,000 AD, the last year in the 96th millennium (see Timeline of the far future)